Lamedh or Lamed is the twelfth letter of the Semitic abjads, including Hebrew Lāmed , Aramaic Lāmadh , Syriac Lāmaḏ ܠ, Arabic  , and Phoenician Lāmed .

The Phoenician letter gave rise to the Greek Lambda (Λ), Latin L, and Cyrillic El (Л).

Origin 

The letter is usually considered to have originated from the representation of an ox-goad, i.e. a cattle prod, or a shepherd's crook, i.e. a pastoral staff. In Proto-Semitic a goad was called *lamed-.

Hebrew Lamed

Hebrew spelling:

Pronunciation
Lamed transcribes as an alveolar lateral approximant .

Significance
Lamed in gematria represents the number 30.

With the letter Vav it refers to the Lamedvavniks, the 36 righteous people who save the world from destruction.

As an abbreviation, it can stand for litre. It is also used as the Electoral symbol for the Yisrael Beiteinu party.

As a prefix, it can have two purposes:
 It can be attached to verb roots, designating the infinitive (Daber means "speak", Ledaber means to speak).
 It can also act as a preposition meaning "to" or "for".

Arabic 
The letter is named , and is written in several ways depending on its position in the word:

Some examples on its uses in Modern Standard Arabic. (Normally, diacritics are not written):

A semantically equivalent construction is found in most Romance languages, e.g. French , Spanish , and Italian  (though  is an archaism and not in current use).

Character encodings

References

External links

Phoenician alphabet
Arabic letters
Hebrew letters